Punjab is the largest province in population and the second largest province in physical size in Pakistan. In 2017, 1.75 million tourists visited Pakistan according to the World Travel and Tourism Council.

It is known for its ancient cultural heritage as well as its religious diversity. The lands of Punjab have been home to a number of religions and civilisations. The Indus Valley civilization once ruled the region and a significant archaeological find was discovered at the ancient city of Harrapa. The Gandhara civilisation was also quite dominant in the northern region of Punjab at the site of Taxila. Several other civilisations such as Greeks, Central Asians, and Persians ruled Punjab leaving a number of sites which still exist today. The arrival of Islam came about during the rule of the Umayyad Caliphate (arrival of Muhammad bin Qasim in early 8th century) followed by the Ghaznavids. The Mughals took control of the region later and ruled its land for several centuries. The mughal heritage remained quite strong in Punjab with a large number of forts, tombs and monuments still intact today.

The Durrani Empire ruled the Punjab at the fall of the Mughal Empire for a short period followed by the rise of the Sikh Empire in the 19th century. The strong control of the Sikhs also led to a number of sites still remaining intact throughout Punjab. The British Raj took control of the region until the independence of British India in 1947.

Tourism in Punjab is regulated by the Tourism Development Corporation of Punjab. There are a number of large cosmopolitan cities in Punjab. The provincial capital, Lahore is the second largest city of Pakistan as is known to the Cultural Heart of Pakistan. The Mughal Empire left behind the Lahore Fort and Shalimar Gardens which are now recognised World Heritage Sites. The Walled City of Lahore, Badshahi Mosque, Wazir Khan Mosque, Tomb of Jahangir and Nur Jahan, Tomb of Asaf Khan and Chauburji are other major sites visited by tourists each year. The tomb of Qutb-ud-din Aibak from the Delhi Sultanate is located in the historical market of Anarkali Bazaar in Lahore. The Samadhi of Ranjit Singh and Hazuri Bagh Baradari are prime example of Sikh architecture during the rule of the Sikh Empire. There a number of other sites within Lahore such as Minar-e-Pakistan, Lahore Museum, Data Durbar Complex, Tomb of Muhammad Iqbal, Bagh-e-Jinnah, Lahore Zoo, Tomb of Shah Jamal, Sukh Chayn Gardens, Gaddafi Stadium which all attract a large number of visitors annually.

Rawalpindi is known to be a famous hill station stop for tourists before setting out to Murree, Bhurban, Patriata, Northern Areas, Azad Kashmir and Gilgit-Baltistan.  The Pharwala Fort is a major fort on the outskirts of the city built by an ancient Hindu civilisation. There are a number of sites from the Mughal Empire in the city of Sheikhupura called Hiran Minar and the Sheikhupura Fort. The Rohtas Fort near Jhelum is a major fort built by Sher Shah Suri is a World Heritage Site. The Katasraj temple in the city of Chakwal is a major destination for Hindu devotees. The Khewra Salt Mines is another major tourist attraction as its one of the oldest mines in South Asia. The city of Nankana Sahib is birthplace of the founder of Sikhism. The Gurdwara is visited by a number of pilgrims ever year to mark Guru Nanak Dev birthday. Another famous gurdwara in Punjab is Panja Sahib located in the city of Hasan Abdal. The clock tower and eight bazaars of Faisalabad are famous for its bazaars since they were designed to represent the Union Jack flag.

Travelling southwards, the region starts to become more desertic. Multan is another major tourist destination in Punjab. It is known for its mausoleums of saints and Sufi pirs. The most famous being the Rukn-e-Alam and Baha-ud-din Zakariya. The Multan Museum and Nuagaza tombs are so significant attractions in the city. The city of Bahwalpur is a major destination as it is located near the Cholistan Desert and Thar Desert. The Derawar Fort is a large fort built in the Cholistan Desert which is also the site for the annual Cholistan Jeep Rally. The city is also near the ancient site of Uch Sharif which was once a Delhi Sultanate stronghold. The Noor Mahal, Sadiq Ghar Palace, Darbar Mall are large palaces built during the reign of the Nawabs. The Lal Suhanra National Park is a major zoological garden on the outskirts of the city.

Places of interest

Historical Sites 
 Lahore Fort
 Harrapa
 Taxila
 Chauburji
 Attock Fort
 Derawar Fort
 Rohtas Fort, Jhelum
 Noor Mahal
 Hiran Minar, Sheikhupura
 Katas Raj Temples
 Khewra Salt Mine
 Shalimar Gardens
 Tomb of Jahangir and his wife Nur Jahan and her brother Asif Khan
 Uch

Hilly Areas
 Murree
 Bhurban
 Patriata
 Fort Munro
 Kotli Sattian
 Kahuta

Lakes
 Khabikki Lake
 Namal Lake
 Uchhali Lake
 Swaik Lake

Valleys
 Phugla
 Soan Sakaser Valley
 Soon Valley

Rivers
 Indus River
 Chenab River
 Sutlaj River
 Ravi River
 Jhelum River
 Bunhar River
 Korang River
 Soan River
 Swan River
 Panjnad River

See also 
 Tourism in Pakistan
 Tourism in Balochistan, Pakistan
 Tourism in Sindh
 Tourism in Khyber Pakhtunkhwa
 Tourism in Azad Kashmir
 Tourism in Gilgit-Baltistan
 Tourism in Karachi

References

External links 

Tourism in Punjab, PTDC
Tourism Department of Punjab
Tourism Development Corporation of Punjab

 
Tourist attractions in Punjab, Pakistan